The 2022 Rebellion was a professional wrestling pay-per-view (PPV) event produced by Impact Wrestling. It took place on April 23, 2022, at the Majed J. Nesheiwat Convention Center in Poughkeepsie, New York. It was the fourth event under the Rebellion chronology.

10 matches were contested at the event, including two on the pre-show and one taped as a digital exclusive. In the main event, Josh Alexander defeated Moose to win the Impact World Championship. In other prominent matches, Ace Austin defeated Mike Bailey and defending champion Trey Miguel in a three-way match to win the Impact X Division Championship, Violent By Design (Eric Young and Joe Doering) retained the Impact World Tag Team Championship in an Eight-Team Elimination Challenge, and Taya Valkyrie defeated Deonna Purrazzo to win the AAA Reina de Reinas Championship.

Production

Background 
Rebellion is a professional wrestling event produced by Impact Wrestling. It is annually held during the month of April, and the event was first held in 2019. At Hard To Kill, Impact Wrestling announced Rebellion would take place in on April 23, 2022, at the Majed J. Nesheiwat Convention Center in Poughkeepsie, New York.

Storylines 

The event featured several professional wrestling matches that involved different wrestlers from pre-existing scripted feuds, plots, and storylines. Wrestlers portrayed heroes, villains, or less distinguishable characters in scripted events that build tension and culminate in a wrestling match or series of matches. Storylines were produced on Impact's weekly television program.

At Bound for Glory, in October 2021, Josh Alexander defeated Christian Cage to win the Impact World Championship. While Alexander was celebrating with his family, Moose, who earlier won the Call Your Shot Gauntlet match, ambushed him and invoked his opportunity, immediately capturing the title. In the following months, Alexander wanted revenge on Moose, but was repeatedly denied by Impact Executive Vice President, Scott D'Amore. On the February 10, 2022 episode of Impact!, Alexander continued to attack Big Kon after defeating him. Security would try to intervene, but Alexander would push them away, and he even pushed D'Amore. As a result, D'Amore would send Alexander home, as a kayfabe explanation for Alexander's contract and work visa expiring. At Sacrifice, after Moose retained the Impact World Championship against Heath, Alexander returned to attack Moose, and announced that he had signed both a new multi-year Impact Wrestling contract, and a contract to face Moose for his World title in the main event of Rebellion.

On March 8, Impact Wrestling announced that Trey Miguel will defend the Impact X Division Championship in a three-way match at Rebellion, with two other three-way matches to take place on following episodes of Impact! to determine his challengers. Ace Austin and Mike Bailey qualified for the three-way match by defeating Crazzy Steve and John Skyler, and Laredo Kid and Willie Mack, respectively.

On the February 10, 2022 episode of Impact!, after Josh Alexander was sent home by Scott D'Amore, Team Impact (Chris Sabin, Eddie Edwards, Rich Swann, and Rhino) elected ROH World Champion Jonathan Gresham to replace Alexander in their match against Honor No More (Matt Taven, Mike Bennett, Kenny King, PCO, and Vincent) at No Surrender. At No Surrender, Edwards would ultimately betray Team Impact and allow Honor No More to win; he was later revealed as the faction's leader on the following episode of Impact!. On March 25, it was announced that Gresham will face off with Edwards at Rebellion. On April 23, it was announced that Gresham was removed from the match due to an injury and was replaced by Chris Bey.

At Sacrifice, Violent By Design (Eric Young and Joe Doering) defeated The Good Brothers (Doc Gallows and Karl Anderson) to win the Impact World Tag Team Championship. On the March 17 episode of Impact!, The Good Brothers confronted Scott D'Amore about a rematch, which they received in the form of a lumberjack match for the following week. In addition, D'Amore announced that whoever would be champion after that match would defend against their opponents, as well as six other teams, in an Eight-Team Elimination Challenge at Rebellion. VBD would retain the titles due to interference by Honor No More.

On the March 31 episode of Impact!, Rosemary won a battle royal to become the number one contender to the Impact Knockouts World Championship, and will face champion Tasha Steelz at Rebellion.

At Multiverse of Matches, Deonna Purrazzo successfully defended the AAA Reina de Reinas Championship against Faby Apache—the woman she beat for the title—in her latest "Champ-Champ Open Challenge". However, Purrazzo's victory would be inturrupted by Taya Valkyrie, making her return to Impact after over a year and challenging Purrazzo for the title at Rebellion.

After Honor No More defeated Team Impact at No Surrender, Steve Maclin began to target members of the Impact roster who may have doubted his loyalty to the company. After defeating Eddie Edwards by disqualification, Maclin picked up wins over Rhino and Heath before being beaten by Alex Shelley, after help from Shelley's tag team partner Chris Sabin. At Multiverse of Matches, Maclin attacked Sabin after the latter had beaten Jay White, but would soon fall victim to a low blow by White. On April 7, Impact announced a three-way match between Maclin, Sabin, and White for Rebellion.

Event

Countdown to Rebellion 
Before the event went live on pay-per-view, Kenny King defeated Crazzy Steve which was aired as an Impact Digital Exclusive on April 26.

During the Rebellion pre-show, Eddie Edwards faced Chris Bey. In the end, Edwards performed a fisherman driver on Bey to win the match.

Also on the pre-show, The Influence (Madison Rayne and Tenille Dashwood) successfully defended the Knockouts World Tag Team Championship against The IInspiration (Cassie Lee and Jessie McKay), after performing a double front facelock drop on McKay.

Preliminary matches 
The actual pay-per-view started with three-way match Chris Sabin, Jay White and Steve Maclin. After Sabin performed a Cradle Shock on White, Maclin rolled Sabin into a pinfall to steal the victory.

Next, Deonna Purrazzo defended the AAA Reina de Reinas Championship against Taya Valkyrie. In the end, Valkyrie performed the Road to Valhalla to win the title for the fourth time in her career.

After that, Trey Miguel defended the X Division Championship against Ace Austin and Mike Bailey in a three-way match. During the match, Miguel performed a diving meteora into a pinfall, however, Austin pulled the referee before he could count to three. In the end, Austin performed The Fold on Miguel to pin him and win the title for the sixth time in his career.

Aftermath 
On April 27, The IInspiration announced that they are indefinitely stepping away from in-ring action in order to pursue other opportunities, thus leaving Impact.

Results

Tag Team Elimination Challenge

Notes

References

External links 
 

2022 Impact Wrestling pay-per-view events
2022 in New York (state)
April 2022 events in the United States
Events in Poughkeepsie, New York
Events in New York (state)
Impact Wrestling Rebellion
Professional wrestling in New York (state)